Järla IF is a Swedish sports club located in Nacka. It was formed on June 10 1914 and the club was transformed into an alliance association, each section serving as its own sports club.

Football

Background
Järla IF FK currently plays in Division 4 Stockholm Mellersta which is the sixth tier of Swedish football. They play their home matches at the Nacka IP in Nacka.

The club is affiliated to Stockholms Fotbollförbund.

Season to season

In their most successful period Järla IF competed in the following divisions:

In recent seasons Järla IF FK have competed in the following divisions:

Orienteering 
The orienteering section was formed in 1923 and it has a house in Hästhagen close to Nackareservatet north to Källtorpssjön. 

The club won the women's relay in 10-mila in 2018 with Stina Haraldsson, Emma Klingenberg, Sara Sjökvist, Elin Hemmyr Skantze and Karolin Ohlsson.

Footnotes

External links
 http://www.jarlaif.se/ Järla IF FK] – Official website
 Järla IF FK on Facebook

Football clubs in Stockholm
Orienteering clubs in Sweden